Kueh Pie Tee or simply Pie Tee is a thin and crispy pastry tart shell kuih (kueh) often filled with a spicy, shredded Chinese turnips, sweet mixture of thinly sliced vegetables and prawns. It is a popular Peranakan dish, that is often consumed during Chinese New Year or tea parties. 

The shells are made of flour and though some stores will make them from scratch, they can usually be found ready made in most supermarkets. Similar to popiah, the main filling is shredded jicama and carrots, and usually these two dishes are sold by the same stall in hawker centres.

Etymology 
Kueh Pie Tee is known by different names across the Southeast Asia region, with several variations in spelling. Kueh Pie Tee is pronounced as kjˈuː pˈa͡ɪ tˈiː, and is also known as Koay Pai Ti', 'Kuih Pie Tee' or 'Kuih Pai Ti. The word 'kueh' is a loanword that combines the Malay word kueh, which means dessert, and from the Minnan dialect kueh (Minnan: kueh or koé (粿); Chinese: 粿; pinyin: guǒ) which means a flour-based dish.

'Pie' is derived from the English word 'pie' while other regional variations that use pai uses it as a loanword from the Malay language, 'pai' which means pie. In other accounts, the phrase pie tee (or pai ti or pai tee) may have been derived from the English term 'patty'.

Kueh pie tee may also be known as Tophats, suggesting that part of the dish was likely influenced by Western culture.

History 

While the origins of the kueh pie tee remain unclear, there are several speculations on how the Kueh Pie Tee was invented. Based on currently available sources, the Kueh Pie Tee was  invented in the early 20th century. The kueh pie tee is believed to be derived from the popiah. The popiah was likely introduced to the Southeast Asia region by the Chinese migrants moving there. The snack's prolonged exposure to its surrounding multi-ethnic influences, such as Malay cuisine and Western cuisine, led to the adaptation of the original 'baobing' recipe to create the kueh pie tee.

Origins
Kueh pie tee is originally from Singapore. One of the earliest recorded kueh pie tee recipes is found in Ellice Handy's My Favourite Recipes, published in 1952. This recipe book was one of the first few recipe books that featured Malayan dishes and ingredients. In this recipe book, the instructions to make the kueh pie tee are found in two recipes named the Popia and the Pie Tee. Handy's Popia recipe provides steps to make the kueh pie tee's filling, while her Pie Tee recipe contains instructions to make the piecrust shells. Noting that the recipe is found in a recipe book published in Singapore, this suggests that the kueh pie tee's origins may be related to the local cuisine of Singapore.

Peranakan Ong Jin Teong has also suggested in his Peranakan heritage books that the Kueh Pie Tee may have originated in Singapore. The recipe found in Ong's book, Penang Heritage Food, belongs to his mother, who compiled the recipe in the 1950s. Additionally, the kueh pie tee is also known outside of Singapore as the 'Singapore Poh Piah' or 'Syonan-to Pie', further suggesting that the snack have originated from Singapore before subsequently becoming popular in other parts of the region.

Currently, the kueh pie tee remains popular throughout the countries of maritime Southeast Asia. Along with Singapore, it is also popular in Malaysia and Indonesia.

See also
 Kue
 Chinese Indonesian cuisine
 Malay cuisine
 Peranakan cuisine

Notes

References 

Kue
Singaporean cuisine
Peranakan cuisine